The women's aerials competition of the FIS Freestyle Ski and Snowboarding World Championships 2015 was held at Kreischberg, Austria on January 14 (qualifying)  and January 15th (finals). 
20 athletes from 9 countries competed.

Qualification
The following are the results of the qualification.

Final
The following are the results of the finals.

References

Aerials, women's